Jignesh Harshadrai Desai (born April 18, 1974) is an Indian-born American former cricketer who represented the United States cricket team in four matches from 2003–04 to 2004. His record includes one first-class game in the 2004 ICC Intercontinental Cup and three one-day games, the last one of which was in the first ever One Day International the US played, which was against New Zealand in the 2004 ICC Champions Trophy.

External links

1974 births
Living people
People from Navsari district
United States One Day International cricketers
American cricketers
Indian emigrants to the United States
American sportspeople of Indian descent